direct.h is a C/C++ header file provided by Microsoft Windows, which contains functions for manipulating file system directories. Some POSIX functions that do similar things are in unistd.h.

Member functions

See also 
 File system
 Directory structure

References  

C (programming language) headers